Tonfanau is a coastal village in the community of Llangelynin, in Gwynedd (formerly Merionethshire), Wales. The village is served by Tonfanau railway station.

During the Second World War an army base was created near the village. Around 600 men were stationed at the camp, which specialised in training personnel in anti-aircraft artillery.

Until 1992, a granite quarry existed to the north of the village.

All Arms Junior Leaders' Regiment 

From May 1959 until August 1966 the camp was the home of the All Arms Junior Leaders' Regiment (A.A.J.L.R.).

PYTHON site 

From 1968 the camp was one of the designated sites for plan PYTHON, the plan for continuity of government in the event of nuclear war. It was only the temporary PYTHON site for Wales and Aberystwyth University became the designated site soon after.

Refugee Camp 

In 1972, six years after closing in 1966, the base was reopened and used as a refugee centre. Over 3,000 Ugandan Asians, fleeing from persecution by Idi Amin, were housed there for six months before being settled elsewhere.

Motor Racing 

There is a one mile long racing circuit named after the village which is mainly used for motorbike races, although car racing is also done on the track.

Transport 

Tonfanau Railway Station is located on the Transport For Wales Cambrian Line. It has close connections to Birmingham (New St), Shrewsbury, Llandudno, and Aberystwyth. The next station south is Tywyn, and the next station north is Llwyngwril.

Granite Quarry 

In 1892, a group of local miners opened a granite quarry to the north of the village. Among them was William Williams Jones, who was a draper from Tywyn and attempted to open many quarries in the district – among them were Dolgoch quarry, Melinllynpair quarry, and Nantcynog quarry (which were all unsuccessful – Tonfanau quarry was his only enduring mining venture).

During the First World War, several German prisoners of war (who were being housed in Tywyn worked at the quarry between June 1918 and November 1919 (after which they were transferred to Frongoch internment camp near Bala); one of them experienced a fatal accident – they died from the injuries in Machynlleth Cottage Hospital.

The quarry closed in 1998, 106 years after opening.

See also 
 Tonfanau railway station

References

External links 
 Tonfanau quarry's entry on the National Monuments Record of Wales (NMRW)'s website
 The tramway to Tonfanau quarry, on the NMRW's website
 The engine shed and works for the Tonfanau quarry tramway, on the NMRW's website
 Tonfanau army camp, on the NMRW's website
 Tonfanau farm, on the NMRW's website

Villages in Gwynedd
Villages in Snowdonia
Llangelynin, Gwynedd